In Greek mythology, Lamprus ( "shining", "distinguished" or "munificent") was the son of Pandion from Phaestus in Crete and father of Leucippus by Galatea.

Mythology 
Lamprus, wishing to have a son, told his wife, Galatea, to expose the child if it turned out to be a girl. When Galatea gave birth to a girl, she asked the gods to change the sex of her daughter, who Leto turned her into a boy, Leucippus.

Note

References 

 Antoninus Liberalis, The Metamorphoses of Antoninus Liberalis translated by Francis Celoria (Routledge 1992). Online version at the Topos Text Project.

Cretan characters in Greek mythology